was a Japanese politician.

Political career
Born in Kirishima, Kagoshima, Ozato's first electoral victory came at the prefectural level in 1959. He served the Kagoshima Prefectural Assembly until 1979, when he was elected to the House of Representatives for Kagoshima 2nd district. In December 1990, Ozato was named Labour Minister. From 1994 to 1995, he led the Okinawa and Hokkaido development agencies. In January 1995, the Great Hanshin earthquake hit Japan, and Ozato was reassigned to handle disaster relief. From 1996 on, he began running for the legislative seat in Kagoshima's fourth district.

Ozato was a member of the Kōchikai faction of the Liberal Democratic Party, originally under the leadership of Kiichi Miyazawa. Soon after Koichi Kato became faction leader the faction split, but Ozato remained affiliated with Kato. Ozato succeeded Koko Sato as director of the Management and Co-ordination Agency in 1997.  Ozato was appointed to lead the Liberal Democratic Party's Executive Council in 2000, replacing Yukihiko Ikeda, but stepped down at the end of the year. Kanezo Muraoka took the position. Ozato was awarded a fourth class Order of the Rising Sun in 2001. He retired from politics in 2005, choosing not to declare his candidacy for that year's elections. Ozato died in 2016 at the age of 86.

Personal life
His son is Yasuhiro Ozato.

References

1930 births
2016 deaths
Ministers of Labour of Japan
Politicians from Kagoshima Prefecture
Members of the House of Representatives (Japan)
Liberal Democratic Party (Japan) politicians
Recipients of the Order of the Rising Sun, 4th class
21st-century Japanese politicians
20th-century Japanese politicians